1997 Sangrampora massacre was the killing of seven Kashmiri Pandit villagers in Sangrampora village of Budgam district of Jammu and Kashmir on 21 March 1997 by unknown gunmen. While the militants have been thought behind the killings, police closed the case as untraced.

The attack
This was the one of a series of massacres which selectively targeted minorities in Jammu and Kashmir. The victims were led away and lined up. The unknown gunmen shot and killed seven people.  Several people were injured. The killers fled in the dark.. The people who were living in the Sangrampora were Bhat’s and seven members of their family were killed in this attack.

Aftermath
Muslims in the area expressed deep outrage at this brutality and observed a partial strike to protest this heinous crime.  The last rites of the victims were performed by residents of the village and were attended by Muslims and Sikhs from neighbouring areas as well. Bharatiya Janata Party called for the dismissal of the government of Farooq Abdullah after this massacre. After this massacre Panun Kashmir was dissolved and reorganised. The motive of these killings was thought to be to discourage the Hindu's who had fled Kashmir from returning and getting rehabilitated by the Farooq Abdullah government.

Following the massacre Government of Jammu and Kashmir provided 2-room flats to Kashmiri Hindus in a colony exclusively built for them in Sheikhpora in Budgam District.  The state government also provided the survivors ration and Rs 100,000.

See also
 Persecution of Hindus
 Anti-Hindu sentiment
 Panun Kashmir
 Timeline of the Kashmir conflict
 1986 Anantnag Riots
 Exodus of Kashmiri Hindus
 2001 Amarnath pilgrimage massacre
 2003 Nadimarg massacre

References

External links
Kashmir – Wail of Valley Atrocity and Terror By Mohan Lal Koul-Chapter 16
Sangrampora Massacre of Kashmiri Hindus a slide presentation

Islamic terrorist incidents in 1997
Massacres in 1997
Terrorist incidents in India in 1997
March 1997 events in Asia
March 1997 crimes
Islamic terrorism in India
Mass murder in 1997
Massacres in Jammu and Kashmir
Budgam district
1990s in Jammu and Kashmir
Religiously motivated violence in India
Massacres of Hindus in Kashmir